Jean Borella (born in Nancy, France, May 21, 1930) is a Christian philosopher and theologian. Borella's works are inspired by Ancient and Christian Neoplatonism, but also by the Traditionalist School of René Guénon and Frithjof Schuon.

Biography
Borella's father, who was Italian, made a career in military aviation before his death in 1937 in an air crash, when Jean was seven years old. Borella's mother was French from Lorraine. Borella had a Catholic education and traditional public school secondary studies which reinforced in him the idea that he would be a defender of the faith.  By age 14, Borella understood Cartesian proof of the existence of God. In 1950, he stayed for a short while in a Benedictine monastery, but left, disappointed.

Borella attended university in Nancy, France. Two of Borella's philosophy professors had significant influence on him, Georges Vallin and Guy Bugault.  Vallin, French Orientalist and philosopher, primarily taught the principles of Vedanta.  Bugault taught the philosophy of Khâgne. While both Vallin and Bugault were readers of René Guénon, they did not speak of Guénon in class or in private conversations with Borella. Borella graduated in 1953 with a degree in philosophy, and, in the same year, became familiar with Guénon, and then with Frithjof Schuon.

In 1954, Borella married a Polish woman.

By 1957, Borella was a professor of philosophy in Gérardmer.  In 1962, he became professor in Nancy, France, where he taught philosophy and French until 1977. In 1982, he was at the University of Paris X: Nanterre.

Borella has three daughters, the youngest of which is a Benedictine nun, and four grandchildren.

Bibliography

 Bérard, Bruno, and Jean Borella. Jean Borella, la révolution métaphysique: après Galilée, Kant, Marx, Freud, Derrida. Religions et spiritualité. Paris: Harmattan, 2006. 
 Esotérisme guénonien et mystère chrétien, L’Age d’Homme, Lausanne, 1997.
 Histoire et théorie du symbole, L’Age d’Homme,Lausanne, 2004 (édition revue et corrigée du "Mystère du signe", Maisonneuve et Larose, 1989).
 La charité profanée, Editions Dominique Martin Morin. 
 La crise du symbolisme religieux, L’Age d’Homme, Lausanne, 1990.
 Le poème de la Création. Traduction de la Genèse 1-3, Ad Solem, 2002.
 Le sens du surnaturel, Ad Solem, Genève 1996.
 Lumières de la théologie mystique, L'Age d'Homme, Lausanne, 2002.
 Penser l’analogie, Ad Solem, Genève 2000.
 Symbolisme et réalité, Ad Solem, 1997.

 The sense of the supernatural
 Guénonian Esoterism and Christian Mystery 
 The Secret of the Christian Way: A Contemplative Ascent Through the Writings of Jean Borella , Borella, Jean, and G. John Champoux.. SUNY series in Western esoteric traditions. Albany: State University of New York Press, 2001. 
 The Torn Veil
 Love and Truth: The Christian Path of Charity (trans: La charité profanée)
 The Crisis of Religious Symbolism & Symbolism and Reality (trans: La crise du symbolisme religieux & Symbolisme et réalité)

Further reading 
 Renaud Fabbri, The Problematic of the Unity of Religions Vincit Omnia Veritas. III,1
 Jean Hani : Le Monde à l'envers, Essais critiques sur la civilisation moderne, Lausanne, l'Âge d'homme, « Delphica », 2001,  
 Meramo, Basilio, and Bernard Tissier de Mallerais. Les hérésies de la gnose du professeur Jean Borella. Sion: Editions Les Amis de saint François de Sales, 1996. 
 A Metaphysics of the Christian Mystery: An Introduction to the Work of Jean Borella - Author: Bruno Berard

References

External links

 Intelligence spirituelle et Surnaturel
 Official site

1930 births
Living people
Writers from Nancy, France
French Christians
French philosophers
Christian philosophers
Traditionalist School
French male writers